Benjamin Alexander Raine (born 14 September 1991) is an English cricketer.  Raine is a left-handed batsman who bowls right-arm medium-fast, playing for Durham.  He was born in Sunderland, Tyne and Wear.

Raine made a single appearance for Northumberland against Shropshire in 2010 MCCA Knockout Trophy.  In 2011, Raine made his debut for Durham in a List A match in the Clydesdale Bank 40 against Warwickshire.  Later in the 2011 season, Raine made his first-class debut against Sri Lanka A.  In this match, he was dismissed in Durham's first-innings for 4 runs by Shaminda Eranga, while in their second-innings he was dismissed for 7 runs by Sachithra Senanayake.

In June 2022, in the 2022 County Championship, Raine scored his maiden century in first-class cricket, scoring 103 not out against Worcestershire.

References

External links

1991 births
Living people
Cricketers from Sunderland
English cricketers
Northumberland cricketers
Durham cricketers
Leicestershire cricketers
Otago cricketers
Northern Superchargers cricketers